Ashley Miller may refer to:
 Ashley Miller (director) (1867–1949), American director and writer
 Ashley Miller (screenwriter) (born 1971), American screenwriter and producer
 Ashley Miller (footballer) (born 1994), English footballer